Adair Park is an urban park in Independence, Missouri. The 40-acre park is equipped with a softball field and walking trail. The park has the name of Joseph Adair, the first white child born within the county's borders.

References

Protected areas of Jackson County, Missouri
Parks in Missouri
Parks in the Kansas City metropolitan area